Tsokolate, also spelled chocolate, is a Filipino thick hot chocolate drink. It is made from tabliya or tablea, tablets of pure ground roasted cacao beans, dissolved in water and milk. Like the Spanish-Mexican original drink of sweet hot chocolate, the drink is traditionally made in a tsokolatera and briskly mixed with a wooden baton called the molinillo (also called  batidor or batirol), causing the drink to be characteristically frothy. Tsokolate is typically sweetened with a bit of muscovado sugar, and has a distinctive grainy texture.

Tsokolate is commonly consumed at breakfast with traditional kakanin delicacies or pandesal and other types of traditional Filipino pastries. It is also popular during Christmas season in the Philippines, particularly among children.

Names
Tsokolate is also known as suklati in Kapampangan; sikulate in Maguindanao; and sikwate or sikuwate in Visayan languages. All are derived from Spanish chocolate ("chocolate"), ultimately from Nahuatl xocolātl.

Tabliya

Tabliya or (also spelled tableya or tablea, from Spanish tablilla, "tablet") are small traditionally home-made tablets of pure ground roasted cacao beans. Tabliya is made by drying beans of ripe cacao fruit for two or three days. The dried beans are shelled and roasted. They are ground into a thick chocolate liquor paste that are then formed into the characteristic little discs or balls and allowed to dry.

Aside from tsokolate, tabliya is used in a wide variety of other traditional desserts in the Philippines, most prominently in champorado, a glutinous rice porridge flavored with chocolate.

Preparation

Tsokolate is traditionally prepared by boiling water and milk in a special high-necked pitcher-shaped pot known as a tsokolatera (also tsokolatehan, sikulatihan, sikwatehan, etc.). It is taken off from the flame once bubbles start to form and a few discs of tabliya are dropped into the liquid. Muscovado sugar and more milk or cream is also added, to taste. A special wooden baton called the molinillo (also called  batidor or batirol) is then inserted through the top and briskly twirled using the palms of the hands to bring the liquid to a froth. It is then poured into individual cups.

Modern methods of making tsokolate can include using regular whisks, blenders, or milk frothers to achieve the same frothy consistency. Additional ingredients like cinnamon, vanilla, pinipig rice flakes, or even rum or tequila can also be added. However, using commercial cocoa powder instead of tabliya is strongly frowned upon, as it does not give the same texture or taste.

Cultural significance
Tsokolate is commonly consumed at breakfast or merienda with traditional kakanin or bread. Common pairings with tsokolate include pandesal, puto maya, puto bumbong, churros, ensaymada, buñuelos (or cascaron), suman, kesong puti, and bibingka. It is also popular during Christmas season in the Philippines, particularly among children.

In the novel Noli Me Tangere (1887) by the Philippine national hero, José Rizal, the antagonist character Padre Salvi is alleged by his rival, the alferez of the Guardia Civil, to calculatingly serve thick chocolate (espeso) for important guests and watered-down chocolate (aguado) for guests he deemed unimportant. According to the alferez, Salvi surreptitiously signals his servant to prepare either by saying "chocolate, eh?" or "chocolate, ah?" - "eh" and "ah" actually being short for espeso and aguado. The narrator states he is unsure if this is just slander because the same story has been told about many priests, or it may be a practice of Salvi's Franciscan Order. Following Rizal, the terms "Chocolate Eh" and "Chocolate Ah" have been adopted by some establishments.

See also

 Kinutil
 Champorado
 Chocolate industry in the Philippines
 Kapeng barako
 List of chocolate drinks

References

Philippine cuisine
Chocolate drinks
Hot drinks
Non-alcoholic drinks
Christmas food